Neisseria flava (Latin: flava, yellow, golden) is a bacterium belonging to a group of species under the genus Neisseria that is considered non-pathogenic. Along with its other members of the non-pathogenic group, Neisseria flava is often found in the upper respiratory tract surface in humans. On rare occasions, it can cause rheumatic heart disease and ventricular septal defect aortic insufficiency.

Identification
Steps
Perform Gram-stain to identify the bacterium in question, continue to step 2 if it is found to be Gram negative cocci.
Neisseria flava is an aerobic microbe, try growing some of the same in the presence in air/air + .
Transfer sample able to growth in air to a NA medium at 25C, continue to step 4 if colonies are observed.
If not, be aware of the microbe being handled, it is either Neisseria meningitidis or Neisseria gonorrhoeae, both of which are pathogenic.
Finally, perform nitrate test.
Alternative test is Oxidative/fermentation glucose test(O/F test). If found to be oxidative, it is Neisseria spp.
If positive in the final test, the microbe is Moraxella.
If negative in the final test, the microbe is Neisseria spp.

References

External links
Type strain of Neisseria flava at BacDive -  the Bacterial Diversity Metadatabase

Neisseriales